Room with a View may refer to:

 A Room with a View, a 1908 novel by E. M. Forster

Film and television
 A Room with a View (1985 film), a film adaptation of Forster's novel
 "Rm w/a Vu", a 1999 episode of Angel
 "Rooms with a View",  a 2002 episode of Frasier
 A Room with a View (2007 film), a British television adaptation of Forster's novel

Music

Albums
 Room with a View, a 1980 album by Player
 Room with a View (album), a 2001 album by Carolyn Dawn Johnson and the title song

Songs
 "A Room with a View", a song from the revue This Year of Grace by Noël Coward
 "Room with a View", a song by Atheist from Piece of Time
 "Room with a View", a song by Brother Ali from Shadows on the Sun
 "A Room with a View", a song by Death Angel from Act III
 "Room with a View", a song by Jeffrey Osborne
 "Room with a View", a song by The Tear Garden from Tired Eyes Slowly Burning
 "Room with a View", a song by Tina Dico from In the Red
 "Room with a View", a song by Tony Carey from Wilder Westen inclusive soundtrack
 "A Room with a V.U.", a song by Voivod from Infini
 "Room with a View", a song by Wall of Voodoo from Seven Days in Sammystown.